Vladimir Shibeko (born 2 March 1986) is a Belarusian former professional footballer.

References

External links
 
 Profile at teams.by
 

1986 births
Living people
Belarusian footballers
Association football defenders
FC SKVICH Minsk players
FC Granit Mikashevichi players
FC DSK Gomel players
FC Slutsk players
FC Isloch Minsk Raion players
FC Orsha players
FC Kletsk players
FC Krumkachy Minsk players
FC Uzda players